This is an incomplete list of seasons competed by the Hamilton Tigers, a Canadian football team that competed in the Interprovincial Rugby Football Union and Ontario Rugby Football Union. The Hamilton Football Club was formed on November 3rd, 1869 and was first referred to as the Tigers in a game against the Toronto Argonauts on October 18th, 1873, while also wearing black and gold for the first time. They were one of four original teams that formed the IRFU on September 13th, 1907 and played in that league for 34 seasons before joining the ORFU in 1948. 

In 1941, during World War II, a new team, named the Hamilton Wildcats began playing in the Ontario Rugby Football Union after the Tigers suspended operations due to most of their players fighting in the war. After the Tigers rejoined the IRFU, the two teams were simultaneously competing for the Grey Cup. In 1950, the two clubs merged under the moniker Hamilton Tiger-Cats after it became apparent that both teams would not be able to compete financially in the same market.

Throughout their history, the Tigers won five Grey Cups.

See also
 List of Hamilton Tiger-Cats seasons